Diphyoropa is a genus of pinwheel snails that is endemic to Australia.

Species
 Diphyoropa illustra (Gabriel, 1947)
 Diphyoropa jonesi Stanisic, 2010
 Diphyoropa macleayana Hyman & Stanisic, 2005
 Diphyoropa saturni (Cox, 1864)

References

 
 

 
 
Gastropod genera
Gastropods of Australia